A by-election was held for the Australian House of Representatives seat of Wakefield on 28 August 1909. This was triggered by the death of the Speaker of the House, Sir Frederick Holder.

The by-election was won by Liberal candidate Richard Foster.

Results

References

1909 elections in Australia
South Australian federal by-elections